Allan Gerald "Mouse" Pinder (born September 15, 1948 in Saskatoon, Saskatchewan) is a Canadian former professional ice hockey player who played 353 games in the World Hockey Association and 223 games in the National Hockey League.  He played for the Chicago Black Hawks, California Golden Seals, San Diego Mariners, Cleveland Crusaders, and Edmonton Oilers.  He also played for Canada at the 1968 Winter Olympics, winning bronze, and at the 1969 World Championships.

He later became a broadcaster on the Edmonton Oilers' local telecasts and for the CBC's Hockey Night in Canada.

Career statistics

Regular season and playoffs

International

Awards
 CMJHL First All-Star Team – 1967

External links
 

1948 births
Living people
California Golden Seals players
Canadian ice hockey right wingers
Chicago Blackhawks players
Cleveland Crusaders players
Edmonton Oilers (WHA) players
Ice hockey people from Saskatchewan
Ice hockey players at the 1968 Winter Olympics
Maine Nordiques players
Medalists at the 1968 Winter Olympics
National Hockey League broadcasters
Olympic bronze medalists for Canada
Olympic ice hockey players of Canada
Olympic medalists in ice hockey
San Diego Mariners players
Sportspeople from Saskatoon
Undrafted National Hockey League players